BIMM Institute, formerly known as The British and Irish Modern Music Institute, is a group of eight independent colleges which specialise in the provision of music and creative education in Brighton, Bristol, London, Dublin, Manchester, Berlin, Birmingham, and Hamburg. The institute currently has over 7,000 students and provides Diploma, Degree and Masters level courses. 

The institute was founded in Brighton in 2001 as the Brighton Institute of Modern Music and BIMM Bristol opened in 2008. After acquiring the Tech Music School London (TMS) in 2010, the BIMM Group opened BIMM Dublin in 2011, BIMM Manchester in 2013, BIMM Berlin in 2015, BIMM Birmingham in 2017 and BIMM Hamburg in 2019.

In 2012, the BIMM Group became a full member of UCAS and the UK colleges (Brighton, Bristol and London) were successfully reviewed by the Quality Assurance Agency for Higher Education (QAA). 

In October 2014, the organisation was renamed the "BIMM Institute", as an abbreviation for "British and Irish Modern Music Institute". Since opening the Berlin and Hamburg colleges, the company have dropped the full name to reflect the fact that they are no longer just "British and Irish", referring in all materials simply to BIMM Institute.

In 2016, BIMM Limited, Brighton, Bristol and Manchester were successfully reviewed for educational oversight by the Quality Assurance Agency for Higher Education (QAA) and were commended for the quality of student learning opportunities.

The BIMM Group was purchased by Intermediate Capital Group in 2020.

History
BIMM was founded in 2001 by Damian Keyes, Kevin Nixon, Bruce Dickinson and Sarah Clayman. This team subsequently sold the group to Sovereign Capital in March 2010.

In 1983, Drumtech was founded by Francis Seriau, later becoming Tech Music School. In 2010, BIMM Group acquired Tech Music School London and in 2014 Tech Music School changed its name to BIMM London.

In January 2012, Adam Carswell was appointed as managing director, to lead the management team of Vaseema Hamilton (principal of BIMM Berlin, Brighton, Bristol and London), Dara Kilkenny (principal of BIMM Dublin and Manchester) and Andrew Bates (director of academic quality).

In mid-2012 the group appointed Tony Wadsworth (who was head of EMI from 1998 to 2008 and was chairman of the British Phonographic Industry) as a non-executive director.

In October 2012 the group appointed a marketing director, David O'Connor, and in 2016 appointed a new finance sirector, David Jones-Owen.

According to their website in 2019 the management team consist of Adam Carswell (chief executive officer and head of institution), David Jones-Owen (chief operating officer, UK and Germany), Julia Ruzicka (UK recruitment and admissions director), Bernard Yeboah (group director of finance), Dara Kilkenny (executive principal), Vaseema Hamilton (executive principal), Tom Picken (director of marketing services and customer experience), David O'Connor (employability and product development director) and Louise Jackson (academic director and provost).

BIMM was purchased by Intermediate Capital Group in 2020.

Other colleges 
In 2017, BIMM Institute opened the Brighton Institute for Contemporary Theatre Training (BRICTT) offering BA (Hons) Performing Arts and a further education Diploma in Performing Arts. In 2019, BRICTT rebranded as the Institute for Contemporary Theatre (ICTheatre) and announced they would be opening a second college based in Manchester.

In 2018, BIMM Institute partnered with the Brighton Film School which offers a filmmaking degree and diplomas. In 2019 it rebranded to the Screen and Film School (SFS) as well as announcing that it would be opening in Birmingham and Manchester in 2021.

In 2019, Performers College became part of BIMM Institute. Based in Corringham, Essex, Performers College provide degree-level vocational training in dance and music theatre.

Course and accreditations
BIMM Institute was granted Taught Degree Awarding Powers in the UK by an Order from the Privy Council on 14 March 2019, having demonstrated that it met the criteria to become a recognised body for awarding degrees in the UK. As such, BIMM Institute has overall responsibility for the academic standards and the quality of the qualifications they offer, and are able to award their own undergraduate and master's degrees. BIMM degrees were previously accredited by the University of Sussex. BIMM Dublin courses are validated by Technological University Dublin. From 2020 BIMM's UK colleges have introduced new degree courses, including Joint Honours options; new courses were also introduced in their European colleges.

Level 3 Diploma provision is validated by Edexcel or Rockschool.

Notable alumni

 ADONXS
 James Bay
 Izzy Bizu
 Black Honey
 Chip
 Jason Cooper
 Marina Diamandis
 Ed Drewett
 George Ezra
 Fontaines DC
 Fickle Friends
 The Kooks
 Ella Mai
 Tom Odell
 Ryan O'Shaughnessy
 Luke Sital-Singh
 Ash Soan
 Kate Walsh
 Pale Waves
 Mimi Webb
 Dani Wilde
 The Xcerts

References

External links
UK official website
BIMM/ Dublin official website
Berlin official website

Education in East Sussex
Music schools in England
University of Sussex
Educational institutions established in 2001
2001 establishments in England
Universities and colleges in the Republic of Ireland
Music schools in the Republic of Ireland